Pycnoglypta is a genus of beetles belonging to the family Staphylinidae.

The species of this genus are found in Europe and Northern America.

Species:
 Pycnoglypta aptera Campbell, 1983
 Pycnoglypta baicalica (Motschulsky, 1860)

References

Staphylinidae
Staphylinidae genera